The Avenging Eagle is a 1978  Hong Kong wuxia film produced by the Shaw Brothers Studio, starring Ti Lung, Alexander Fu and Ku Feng. A remake of the film, titled The 13 Cold-Blooded Eagles, was released in 1993.

This film is released in DVD by Dragon Dynasty in the United States.  This release has about 1 minute and 27 sections of missing footage of the final fight scene.  It is believed that the original source for this footage was damaged and was cut from the final release. It was announced in July 2013 that there have been plans for a remake to start shooting in 2014 with collaboration between Celestial Pictures and The Weinstein Company.

Plot 
Eagle Chief Yoh Xi-Hung (Ku Feng) is the leader of a group of bandits called the Iron Boat Clan.  He recruits and raises orphans to be his personal army of ruthless killers -he calls his recruits "Eagles.". One such orphan, indoctrinated by Yoh Xi-Hung, is Chik Ming-sing (Ti Lung). In a series of reflections, we find that Chik was an orphan that was sold to the Iron Boat Clan at the age of seven; he soon becomes one of Chief Yoh's top killers as he relishes engaging opponents in combat whenever the bandits go on a raid. However, after one particularly rough heist, Chik is badly wounded in a solo fight with Golden Spear Tao De-biu.  He escapes into the nearby woods and manages to hide his silver plaque among the fallen leaves just before falling unconscious- thus concealing his membership in the Iron Boat Clan. Chik is later found by a stranger and nursed back to health by his kind family. It is later revealed that this stranger is a police chief -Wang An- a sworn enemy of Yoh Xi-Hung and a target for termination. While recovering, Chik starts having second thoughts about his criminal lifestyle; he begins to realize that there is an alternative to his violent, murderous lifestyle. He learns that he can live a peaceful, nonviolent way of life with a wife and family if he so chooses.

In the present time, we learn that Chik is running from the Iron Boat Clan, following the death of Wang An- who saved him in the woods. As a result of the kindness he received from Wang An and his family, Chik betrays Yoh Xi-Hung and departs from the clan. Meanwhile, Yoh has ordered that Chik be found and brought back for punishment. Chik meets up with a stranger while on the run. The stranger, Cheuk Yi-fan (Alexander Fu), secretly carries hidden wrist knives and is obsessed with hunting down his enemies to revenge the murder of his wife and family at the hands of the Iron Boat Clan. Chik Ming-sing is suspicious of the mysterious Cheuk, even when Cheuk does not hesitate to help him kill the other Eagle Clan members who are chasing him for leaving the bandit clan.

Not knowing that Cheuk Yi-fan is the son of the family that Chik and the other Eagles robbed and murdered, Chik Ming-sing confesses his evil doings to him one evening. Chik reveals that he has vowed to change his ways after that incident and is looking to end the exploits of Eagle Chief Yoh and the entire bandit clan. Chik also reveals that he is searching for the husband of the woman he killed so that he can die at his hands to atone for his crimes.

Cheuk decides to accompany Chik to Eagle headquarters.  Upon the arrival of the duo, Eagle Chief Yoh recognizes Cheuk and reveals his name and true intentions. When Chik asks Cheuk why he did not take his revenge earlier, Cheuk reveals that what he wanted to know the whole story, and that he and Chik should join forces to defeat their common enemy, Chief Yoh Xi-Hung.

Chik and Cheuk manage to eliminate the remaining underlings of the clan and set their efforts on killing Yoh Xi_hung. After a lengthy fight with both men, Yoh attempts to manipulate both fighters to turn on one another.  The two heroes briefly scuffle with each other -with Chik concocting a scheme without Cheuk's knowledge.  As the two men continue to fight each other, Chief Yoh helps to contain Cheuk and holds his sleeve knives in order to provide Chik a chance to kill Cheuk.  In a surprise move, Chik leaps up, lands upon the shoulders of Cheuk and plants his fighting sticks into the shoulders of Yoh.  Cheuk follows by thrusting his double blades into Yoh's midsection. As Yoh Xi-Hung is dying, Chik tells him that it may be easy to raise someone but to win his heart is difficult; and because of this he now knows between right and wrong. Chik then uses his sticks to finish Yoh -ending the murderous reign of the Iron Boat Clan. With Chief Yoh dead, Chik tells Cheuk that he is ready to accept his punishment. Cheuk tells him that all his enemies are now dead and begins to walk away. Chik attacks Cheuk and forces the double blades into his body. He tells Cheuk that if he doesn't get his revenge now, then the spirit of his pregnant wife and unborn child would never know peace.

The final scene of the film show Cheuk looking over the graves where his family is laid to rest. A new headstone can be seen where Chik's remains have also been placed at the burial site.

Cast
Ti Lung as Black Eagle Chik Ming-sing
Alexander Fu as Double Sleeve Knives Cheuk Yi-fan
Ku Feng as Yoh Xi-hung
Wang Lung-wei as Vulture Eagle Yien Lin
Eddy Ko as Blue Eagle Wan Da
Austin Wai as Owl Eagle Cao Gao-shing
Bruce Tong as Eagle
Lam Fai-wong as Eagle
Dick Wei as Eagle
Wong Pau-gei as Eagle
Peter Chan as Soaring Eagle Wang Tao-sang
Yuen Bun as Eagle Yau Koon-hung
Chui Fat as Eagle
Jamie Luk as Eagle Lin Gin-ming
Cheung Gwok-wa as Eagle Fan Lun
Shih Szu as Siu Fung
Yue Wing as Devil's Plight Wang An / Jiang Shun-kwai
Tong Gai as Golden Spear Tao De-biu
Yeung Chi-hing as Se-ma Sun
Ouyang Sha-fei as Se-ma Sun's wife
Jenny Tseng as Se-ma Yu-chin
Yau Chui-ling as Se-ma Sun's second daughter
Kwok Wai-bing	 	 
Au Ga-lai
Lui Hung as Wang An's mother
Hung Ling-ling as Wang An's wife
Lee Hang
Wong Chi-keung
Law Keung as Hung's thug
Wong Chi-ming as Hung's thug
Man Man as inn waiter
Gam Tin-chue as innkeeper

References

External links

1978 films
1978 martial arts films
Hong Kong martial arts films
Hong Kong action films
1978 action films
Kung fu films
Shaw Brothers Studio films
Wuxia films
1970s Mandarin-language films
1970s Hong Kong films